The Ligue nationaliste canadienne, also known as the Ligue nationaliste, was a nationalist and anti-imperialist organization in Quebec, Canada, during the early 20th century. Founded by Henri Bourassa and journalist Olivar Asselin, the newspaper Le Nationaliste was its official organ until 1910, when Bourassa founded Le Devoir which became the Ligue's mouthpiece.

The League opposed political dependence on either Britain or the United States, supporting instead Canadian autonomy within the British Empire.

In the 1908 Quebec election the Ligue won three seats in the Quebec Legislative Assembly; Bourassa won in two seats (Montreal Division #2 and Saint-Hyacinthe) and chose to sit for the latter, and Armand Lavergne was elected in Montmagny. Bourassa did not run for re-election in 1912 Quebec election; Lavergne served as the party's only member until leaving office in the 1916 election.

See also
Quebec nationalism
Politics of Quebec
History of Quebec
Timeline of Quebec history

References

Civic and political organizations of Canada
Political history of Quebec
Defunct provincial political parties in Quebec
1903 establishments in Quebec
Political parties established in 1903
Canadian nationalism
1910s disestablishments in Quebec
Political parties disestablished in the 1910s